Derventio is a Britto-Roman name, but of Celtic origin (dervo- "oak-tree"), and refers to one of the following Roman sites in Roman Britain :

 Derventio (Papcastle), the Roman fort and settlement at Papcastle near Cockermouth, Cumbria
 Derventio Brigantum, a Roman fort and settlement beneath Malton, North Yorkshire
 Derventio Coritanorum, the Roman fort and settlement at Little Chester, Derbyshire
 Stamford Bridge, East Riding of Yorkshire, the site of the Roman fort Derventio near York